A rules lawyer is a participant in a rules-based environment who attempts to use the letter of the law without reference to the spirit, usually in order to gain an advantage within that environment.  The term is commonly used in wargaming and tabletop role-playing game communities, often pejoratively, as the "rules lawyer" is seen as an impediment to moving the game forward. The habit of players to argue in a legal fashion over rule implementation was noted early on in the history of Dungeons & Dragons. Rules lawyers are one of the "player styles" covered in Dungeon Master for Dummies. The rules of the game Munchkin include various parodies of rules lawyer behavior.

Related terms 

 In the US military, "sea lawyer" is used in the navy and "barracks lawyer" in the army.
 The term "language lawyer" is used to describe those who are excessively familiar with the details of programming language syntax and semantics.
 On English Wikipedia, a "wikilawyer" is a contributor who attempts to use the wording of policies to win disputes rather than reaching the goal of the policy.

See also 
 Gaming the system
 Letter and spirit of the law
 Malicious compliance
 Nomic

References

External links 
  — Loke advocates Games Masters using rules lawyers to their advantage, by turning the other players against them.
  — a description of two “rules-lawyer traps": always insisting upon following the rules and  believing that there should always be a rule to cover every situation
  — which lists the rules lawyer's two weapons as “an onslaught of evidence, textual readings, precedent, and reasoning” and the “dreaded filibuster”.

Role-playing game terminology